Xylosma capillipes is a species of flowering plant in the family Salicaceae. It is endemic to New Caledonia.

References

capillipes
Endemic flora of New Caledonia
Critically endangered plants
Taxonomy articles created by Polbot